Bobbodus is an extinct genus of eugeneodont shark from the Carboniferous and Permian periods. B. schaefferi is the type species and is known from three specimens, all from what was the eastern coast of the Panthallasic Ocean. They were found in the Kasimovian of Iowa, Gzhelian of Nebraska, Asselian of Kansas. Specimens of this species show the partial upper and lower dentition, the palatoquadrate, and gill arch. B. xerxesi is known from a single tooth found in Wuchiapingian-aged deposits in the Baghuk Mountains of central Iran. It is named for Xerxes, a famous Archaemenid ruler from the area whose monuments impressed the first author of the paper describing it.

References

Eugeneodontida
Prehistoric cartilaginous fish genera